Gymnopilus aeruginosus, also known as the magic blue gym, is a mushroom-forming fungus that grows in clusters on dead wood and wood chip mulch. It is widely distributed and common in the Pacific Northwest. It has a rusty orange spore print and a bitter taste and contains the hallucinogen psilocybin. It was given its current name by mycologist Rolf Singer in 1951.

Description
The species is psychoactive, containing the hallucinogenic drugs psilocybin and psilocin. The specific epithet aeruginosus refers to the bluish staining caused by psilocin polymerization.

Cap
The cap is 5–15 cm across, convex with an incurved margin and expands to broadly convex to almost plane in age. The top is dry, fibrillose, and scaly, often with a blueish-green tinge when young. The color is variable, often with various bluish-green, pink, or vinaceous patches. The cap is sometimes cracked in age. The flesh is pallid to whitish, sometimes turning buff or pinkish-buff in age. The scales are tawny or reddish becoming dark brown.

Gills
The gills are close or crowded, and broad. They are buff to yellow-orange or ochre, and adnexed to adnate. They are at first slightly decurrent, often seceding. The edges are even to slightly rough.

Spores
Spores are 6—9 µm by 3.5—4.5 µm and have no germ pore. They are roughened and elliptical. Pleurocystidia are rare and clamp connections are present. The basidia each have four spores. Gymnopilus aeruginosus has a rusty to rusty-orange or rusty-cinnamon spore print.

Stipe
The stipe is 5–12 cm long, 1.0—1.5 cm thick, and has a more or less equal structure. It is covered with appressed fibrils, soon disappearing. It is smooth, dry, dusted with rusty orange spores and has a cottony, scanty, yellowish, partially fibrillose veil that leaves an evanescent zone of hairs near the apex of the stipe. It is colored more or less like the cap; it is flesh whitish, tinged greenish or bluish-green,  becoming yellowish or pinkish-brown when dry. It is solid but becomes hollow, and is sometimes striated.

Habitat and formation

Gymnopilus aeruginosus grows gregariously to cespitosely on stumps, logs, and woodchip mulch/sawdust on hardwood and conifers. It grows in spring, fall, and winter, and is common in the Pacific Northwest. It also grows in some of the southern states of the United States, such as Tennessee, and Georgia.  G. aeruginosus is also found in Japan and Korea.

See also

 List of Gymnopilus species

References

Further reading

External links
 Rogers Mushrooms - Gymnopilus aeruginosus
  

aeruginosus
Entheogens
Inedible fungi
Psychoactive fungi
Psychedelic tryptamine carriers
Fungi described in 1890
Fungi of North America
Taxa named by Charles Horton Peck